It Happened Only Once is a 1958 West German drama film directed by Géza von Bolváry and starring Hans Albers, Helga Martin, and Stanislav Ledinek. It was shot at the Tempelhof Studios in West Berlin. An experienced star recounts the history of the film industry to an aspiring young actress showing a compilation of clips from a variety of German films, many of them featuring Albers himself.

Cast
Hans Albers as himself, Hans Albers
Helga Martin as Sabine
Stanislav Ledinek as Sabine's father
Emmy Burg as Sabine's mother
Karl Hellmer as Barber
Walter Ambrock as Jürgen
Erich Dunskus as Truck Driver
Georg Gütlich as Production Manager
Waltraut Runze as Secretary
Gerda Mallwitz as Secretary
Wolf Harnisch as Kellner in der Filmkantine
Eve Dietrich as Gerti
Alexa von Porembsky as Mutter Schröder
Antonie Jaeckel as Alte Komparsin

References

External links

1950s musical drama films
German musical drama films
Films directed by Géza von Bolváry
West German films
Compilation films
UFA GmbH films
1958 drama films
1950s German films
1950s German-language films
Films shot at Tempelhof Studios